The St. Thomas Seminary in southeast Denver, Colorado, United States was owned by the Vincentian order until it closed in 1995 due to falling enrollment.

Set on a  campus, the buildings were generally grouped around a quadrangle, the first of which was built in 1908.  Future buildings were designed by architect Jules J.B. Benedict in the Mediterranean Revival style.  The property is on the U.S. National Register of Historic Places.

References

Catholic seminaries in the United States
Universities and colleges in Denver
Former Catholic universities and colleges in the United States
Vincentian schools
Educational institutions disestablished in 1995
Defunct private universities and colleges in Colorado